BRB may refer to:
 Bank of the Republic of Burundi or Banque de la République du Burundi, the official name in French of the central bank of Burundi
 Barbados, ISO country code BRB, country in the Caribbean Sea 
 Barreirinhas Airport, IATA Code BRB, airport in Barreirinhas, Brazil 
 "Be right back", in Internet/chat slang, also sometimes treated as a synonym of "bathroom break"
 The Beatles: Rock Band, 2009 music video game 
 Benefits Review Board, a part of the United States Department of Labor 
 Beta Ray Bill, a fictional character from the Marvel universe
 Beveled rim bowl, clay bowls most common in the 4th millennium B.C.
 Bibliothèque royale de Belgique, the Royal Library of Belgium 
 Big red button, a type of command button
 Birmingham Royal Ballet, a ballet company
 Blaire Reinhard Band, a New Jersey rock band
 Blood-retinal barrier, cells in the eye that prevent certain substances from entering the tissue of the retina
 Brandenburg an der Havel, German car number plates BRB, town in Brandenburg, Germany
 BRB Internacional, a Spanish animation studio.
 Brienz Rothorn Bahn, a Swiss railway
 Brigade de répression du banditisme, a special police unit of the French Ministry of the Interior.
 Brazos River Bottom, an LGBT club in Houston
 British Railways Board, the former governing body of British Railways
BRB (Residuary) Limited, its successor
 Britton-Robinson buffer
 Buckling restrained brace, a specialized earthquake bracing system
 "BRB", a song by Bazzi from the album Cosmic